Burnside is suburb in the City of Burnside council area in the eastern suburbs of Adelaide. It is primarily a residential suburb. It was named Burnside, an amalgamation of the Scottish word for creek, "burn" and "side" because of the original property's location on the side of Second Creek.

Description 

Burnside was established and named by Peter Anderson and his family who emigrated from Scotland in 1839. Anderson started a large farm on leased land near Second Creek. The farm had a large number of animals including pigs, poultry and cattle as well as barley and wheat crops. In 1848, the lease was assigned to William Randall who arranged for the town to be laid out around Second Creek. By the 1870s the area had developed into a small village. Burnside Post Office had opened on 21 July 1863.

There are a number of parks but most noticeably bordering several that are shared with other suburbs. The Burnside Swimming Centre is located in nearby Hazelwood Park. Langman Reserve is part of both Burnside and Waterfall Gully and the large Newland Park has several ovals. The Feathers Hotel, a Georgian style pub, is located within the suburb. It is home to Burnside Primary School, a State government school. A number of churches in various denominations including Baptist, Lutheran and Anglican also call the suburb home.

Population 

In the 2016 Census, there were 2,930 people in Burnside. 63.3% of people were born in Australia. The next most common countries of birth were England 6.7% and China 6.1%. 71.6% of people spoke only English at home. Other languages spoken at home included Mandarin at 8.0%. The most common responses for religion were No Religion 36.3%, Catholic 18.4% and Anglican 14.2%.

Notable residents 
 George Aiston (1879–1943), policeman and ethnographer
 Dorrit Black (1891–1951), artist
 Jimmy Melrose (1913–1936), aviator
 Christopher Pyne, federal MP and Liberal frontbencher, a former student of Burnside Primary
 Sydney Talbot Smith (1861–1948), solicitor, freelance journalist and civic worker

See also
 List of Adelaide suburbs

References

External links

 City of Burnside

Suburbs of Adelaide